Jagdish Singh Kushwaha is an Indian politician. He was elected to the Lok Sabha  the lower house of the Parliament of India from  Ghazipur as an Independent.

References

External links
Official biographical sketch in Parliament of India website

India MPs 1989–1991
Lok Sabha members from Uttar Pradesh
1946 births
Living people